The Jersey Financial Services Commission (JFSC) is the regulatory body for financial services in Jersey. It is also the Registrar of Companies for Jersey.

History 
The JFSC was set up as an independent body by law in 1998. Its responsibilities include the regulation of the banking and finance sectors, the registration of companies in Jersey, and "promoting the Island as a centre for financial services". The law was later amended to remove the latter mission. Since then, the commission has been responsible for the implementation of the gradually tighter regulation of the offshore financial activity in Jersey, under international pressure against money laundering and tax avoidance.

External links 

 
 Company registry

Leadership 
Following the appointment of former Director General Martin Moloney as Secretary General of IOSCO, Jill Britton was appointed the Commission's Director General in 2021, the first woman to hold the role.

Mark Hoban became Chair of the Commission in April 2020, succeeding John Eatwell.

References 

Organisations based in Jersey
Government agencies established in 1998
Financial services in Jersey
Economy of Jersey
Financial regulatory authorities